"I'll Go Where Your Music Takes Me" is a pop song written in 1976 by Biddu.  The track appeared twice in the Top 30 of the UK Singles Chart; firstly when recorded by Jimmy James and the Vagabonds in 1976, and then in 1978, when it was covered by Tina Charles. In both instances, the recordings were produced by Biddu.

Jimmy James and the Vagabonds
The original recording was reviewed in Blues & Soul magazine in March 1976, where it got a three star rating (out of five) and the magazine article stated that "Jimmy (James) sounds like Chuck Jackson on this catchy Biddu creation that has all the straits of a disco record... It's "Doctor's Orders" all over again, really". Jimmy James and the Vagabonds disc reached number 23 in the UK Singles Chart in May 1976, and stayed in that listing for a total of eight weeks.

The song later appeared on a James compilation album, Where Your Music Takes Me, issued by Sequel Records in 1999.

Tina Charles

Tina Charles' rendition reached number 27 in the UK Singles Chart in April 1978, and also stayed for eight weeks. It reached number 18 in Ireland.  The record labels of the various countries releases of the single all quoted '1977', although the single was not issued until February 1978. The recording was arranged by Biddu and Gerry Shury.

The track had earlier been included on Charles' fifth album, Heart 'n' Soul (1977).

Other recorded versions
Various versions of the track have been recorded over the years, including those by Brotherhood of Man (re-issued on their compilation album, 20 Disco Greats / 20 Love Songs), the Brighouse and Rastrick Brass Band, Victor Silvester, Grethe Ingmann and Günther Neefs.

References

External links
YouTube of Jimmy James' version on Top of the Pops
Jimmy James version @ Discogs
Tina Charles version @ Discogs

1976 songs
1976 singles
1978 singles
Songs written by Biddu
Tina Charles (singer) songs
Disco songs
Pye Records singles
Columbia Records singles
Songs about music